Uilika Nambahu is a Namibian politician. She was elected mayor of Walvis Bay on 14 May 2008, succeeding Derek Klazen. In May 2010, she was re-elected to serve her third one-year term.

References

External links
 "Let the work begin" in walvisbaycc.org, 13 May 2008

Year of birth missing (living people)
Living people
People from Walvis Bay
21st-century Namibian women politicians
Mayors of places in Namibia
Women mayors of places in Namibia
21st-century Namibian politicians